Kaylin Christen Swart (born 30 September 1994) is a South African soccer player who plays as a goalkeeper for the South Africa women's national team.
She has most recently signed for Johannesburg-based team, JVW FC

Early life 
Swart was born on 30 September 1994 in Port Elizabeth, South Africa.

Career 
Swart started her youth career at Springs Home Sweepers FC in South Africa from which she participated in the 2010 FIFA U-17 Women's World Cup squads in Trinidad and Tobago.

College career 
Kaylin started her career at AIB College of Business but later transferred to Menlo College to play for the Menlo Oaks in 2015.
She appeared in 19 games and made 18 starts during her first season at Menlo and earned a record of 6–6–4 while allowing 17 goals. She had a goals against average of 0.87 (best in Menlo College history) and recorded six shoutouts (second most in team history). She earned All-GSAC honors and a Honorable Mention honors for the NAIA All-American team (the second player in Menlo history to receive this honor). Kaylin also helped Menlo to second place in the conference in goals allowed per game (0.78).
In 2016 (her junior year at Menlo), she appeared in 18 games and made 16 starts and had seven shutouts along with a 5–7–3 record. She had a goals against average of .828 beating her record the previous year to be the best in Menlo College history. She was named in National Soccer Coaches Association of America's All Southwest Region team and was a Third Team All-American, as well as being named in the 2016 All-GSAC.
In 2017 (her senior year at Menlo), she appeared in 16 games (all starts). She recorded six shutouts with a 6–4–3 record. She had a goals against average of 0.82 setting a new record in the program history. She was an All-GSAC, All-Region, and Third-Team All-American honors. She concluded her career with the most saves, shutouts, and the best goals against average in program history. In her senior year, she picked up her first collegiate assist in a draw against The Master's University on 19 October 2017.

International career 
Her first international appearance came on 9 July in 2016 in a match against the US football team in which they lost by a goal to nothing. She was the starting goalkeeper for the South Africa women football team at the 2018 Women Afcon where they lost in the finals to the Super Falcons of Nigeria in a penalty shootout.

Records 
She owns the best goals against average in Menlo program history at 0.824, a mark she set in 2017. She beat this record in each of her three seasons. She recorded at least six shutouts every year making it the most shutouts among keepers in Menlo history (with 19 shutouts in total). She is a three time All-GSAC member, three-time NSCAA All-Region player, and a two-time third team All-American in the NAIA.

References

External links
 

1994 births
Living people
Sportspeople from Port Elizabeth
South African women's soccer players
Women's association football goalkeepers
AIB College of Business alumni
Menlo College alumni
Women's Premier Soccer League players
Des Moines Menace (women) players
South Africa women's international soccer players
South African expatriate soccer players
South African expatriate sportspeople in the United States
Expatriate women's soccer players in the United States
2019 FIFA Women's World Cup players
Soccer players from the Eastern Cape